María Fernanda Yepes Alzate (born 23 December 1980) is a Colombian actress and model. She is mostly known for playing Catalina, in the hit Telemundo telenovela Sin Senos no hay Paraíso. She also played the title role in the Colombian telenovela Rosario Tijeras.

Personal life
María Fernanda Yepés started modeling in her country Colombia at the age of 14. As a model, she has been part of important national and international campaigns including one of Colombia's top female intimates apparel. Most recently she was seen as a print model for the Swimwear line Agua Bendita, which was featured in the "Hottest Swimsuit Issue" of Sports Illustrated in 2007, 2008 and 2009. In order to pursue a career in the media, she moved to Bogotá. Yepés has also studied Psychology, Social Communication, and Journalism, she took photography classes, cooking and spent three years in Spain studying theater art.

Filmography

Film

Television

References

External links

1980 births
Living people
People from Medellín
Colombian film actresses
Colombian television actresses
Colombian telenovela actresses
Colombian female models
21st-century Colombian actresses